Angelus Peak may refer to:

 Angel Sar, also known as Angelus Peak, a mountain in Pakistan
 Maniniaro / Angelus Peak, a mountain in New Zealand